The Thirsty Whale, which opened in 1971, was a rock music club at 8800 Grand Avenue, River Grove, Illinois. It brought in acts like Blue Öyster Cult, Molly Hatchet, Black Oak Arkansas, Extreme, Foghat, Johnny Winter, Mother Love Bone (who played their only Chicago show at the Whale), and Peter Criss. Survivor performed here monthly early in their career.

Future Rock and Roll Hall of Fame inductee Cheap Trick played there regularly in the late 1970s, promoting the release of their first two albums, Black & White and In Color, respectively.

The club began to be a showcase for local Chicago area hard rock and heavy metal bands such as Enuff Z'nuff, D'Molls, 7th heaven band and others from the mid-80s through its closing in 1996. The height of the club was during the mid-1980s. Young bands would have the opportunity to open for national acts to grow their fan base and sometimes the attention of major record companies. Although the Thirsty Whale was a small club in size it had its own scene and from it grew a local music magazine, The Chicago Rocker, which was founded by Tony LaBarabra, one of the clubs many booking agents over the years. Chicago never had the metal scene that Los Angeles had but The Thirsty Whale was always a stopover for most bands playing the arenas in Chicago. If you were to ask a local rock musician from this era, they would say "Without The Thirsty Whale, there wouldn't have been a rock scene in Chicago".

The club closed its doors on June 2, 1996, and was demolished to make way for a BP gas station and McDonald's. LaBarbara has hosted a "Thirsty Whale Reunion" where some of the bands that played The at the Whale, back in its heyday, held a one-night-only reunion.

External links
 Here is a Tribune Article from January 14, 1972, proving the Thirsty Whale was opened in 1971 
Unofficial website
Flyer

Music venues in Illinois
Former music venues in the United States
1975 establishments in Illinois
1996 disestablishments in Illinois